Jhumar or Jhoomar (also called Ghumbar in the Sandalbar area) is a traditional Punjabi dance in Pakistan. It is also popular in the Sandalbar areas of Punjab. It is slower and more rhythmic form. The word  "Jhumar" comes from Jhum/Jhoom, which means Swaying. Jhumar is performed at the wedding ceremonies usually. The dance is also performed in circle, to the tune of emotional songs.

See also

 Bhangra (dance)
 Folk dances of Punjab
 Punjabis
Saraikis

References

External links
 Watch Jhumar Performance Video Online
Punjabi culture
Folk dances of Punjab
Dance in Pakistan
Bhangra (music)
Punjabi words and phrases